Where in the U.S.A. Is Carmen Sandiego? may refer to any of several video games within the Carmen Sandiego franchise.
 Where in the U.S.A. Is Carmen Sandiego? (1986 video game)
 Where in the U.S.A. Is Carmen Sandiego? Deluxe, released in 1992
 Where in the U.S.A. Is Carmen Sandiego? (1996 video game)
 Where in America is Carmen Sandiego?: The Great Amtrak Train Adventure, released in 1998

See also 
 Carmen Sandiego (disambiguation)
 Where in the World Is Carmen Sandiego? (disambiguation)
 Where in Time Is Carmen Sandiego? (disambiguation)